The Stutz Motor Car Company was an American producer of high-end sports and luxury cars based in Indianapolis, Indiana. Production began in 1911 and ended in 1935.

Stutz was known as a producer of fast cars including America's first sports car and, from 1924, luxury cars for the rich and famous.

The brand was revived in 1968 under the aegis of the Stutz Motor Car of America and it unveiled a line of modern retro-look cars. Although the company is still in existence, sales of factory-produced vehicles ceased in 1995.

History
Ideal Motor Car Company, organized in June 1911 by Harry C. Stutz with his friend, Henry F Campbell, began building Stutz cars in Indianapolis in 1911. They set this business up after a car built by Stutz in under five weeks and entered in the name of his Stutz Auto Parts Co. was placed 11th in the Indianapolis 500 earning it the slogan "the car that made good in a day". Ideal built what amounted to copies of the racecar with added fenders and lights and sold them with the model name Stutz Bearcat, Bear Cat being the name of the actual racecar.

The Bearcat featured a  Wisconsin brawny four-cylinder T-head engine with four valves per cylinder, one of the earliest multi-valve engines, matched with one of Harry Stutz's transaxles. Stutz Motor has also been credited with the development of "the underslung chassis", an invention that greatly enhanced the safety and cornering of motor vehicles and one that is still in use today. Stutz' "White Squadron" race team won the 1913 and 1915 national championships before withdrawing from racing in October 1915.

Stutz Motor Car Company of America
In June 1913 Ideal Motor Car Company changed its name to  Stutz Motor Car Company (of Indiana) and Stutz Auto Parts Company (it manufactured Stutz's transaxle) was merged into it. To find new investment capital for expansion Stutz Motor Car Company (of Indiana) was sold in 1916 to Stutz Motor Car Company of America under an agreement with a consortium to list the specially organized holding company's stock on the New York Stock Exchange. As a part of the listing process, the number of cars produced and sold since 1912 was reported to potential investors: 1913, 759; 1914, 649; 1915, 1,079; 1916 (first six months) 874. Stutz, Campbell, Allan A. Ryan, and four others were directors. Stutz was president and Allan A. Ryan vice-president.

Harry Stutz left Stutz Motor on July 1, 1919, and together with Henry Campbell established the H. C. S. Motor Car Company and Stutz Fire Apparatus Company.

Allan Aloysius Ryan (1880–1940), father of Allan A. Ryan Jr., was left in control of Stutz Motor. Ryan Sr., and friends attempted stock manipulation which in April 1920 proved disastrous. Stutz Motor was delisted. The Stutz Motor corner was the last publicly detected intentional corner on the New York Stock Exchange. Ryan Sr., was bankrupt in  August 1922 as well as disinherited by his father, Thomas Fortune Ryan. Meanwhile, two friends of Thomas Fortune Ryan found themselves with large parcels of Stutz stock, Charles Michael Schwab and Eugene Van Rensselaer Thayer Jr. (1881–1937), president of Chase National Bank.

The new owners brought in Frederick Ewan Moskowics, formerly of Daimler-Motoren-Gesellschaft, Marmon, and Franklin, in 1923. Moskowics quickly refocused the company as a developer of safety cars, a recurring theme in the auto industry. In the case of Stutz, the car featured safety glass, a low center of gravity for better handling, and a hill-holding transmission called "Noback". A significant advance was the 1931 DOHC 32-valve in-line 8 called the "DV32" (DV for 'dual valve'). This was during the so-called "cylinders race" of the early 1930s when makers of some expensive cars were rushing to produce multi-cylinder engines. However, Stutz continued its performance heritage with the dual overhead cam, in-line 8 engine design.

The following year, a  Stutz (entered and owned by wealthy French pilot and inventor Charles Weymann) in the hands of by Robert Bloch and Edouard Brisson finished second at the 24 Hours of Le Mans (losing to the  Bentley of Rubin and Barnato, despite losing top gear 90 minutes from the flag), the best result for an American car until 1966. That same year, development engineer and racing driver Frank Lockhart used a pair of supercharged  DOHC engines in his Stutz Black Hawk Special streamliner land speed record car, while Stutz set another speed record at Daytona Beach, reaching  driven by Gil Andersen making it the fastest production car in America. Also in 1927, Stutz won the AAA Championship winning every race and every Stutz vehicle entered finished.

Stutz Motor acquired the manufacturing rights for the Pak-Age-Car, a light delivery vehicle that they had been distributing since 1927. A total of 15 new Stutz models were introduced at the 1932 New York Motor Show by Charles Schwab including the Pak-Age-Car. The delivery vehicle was put into production by Stutz's Package Car Division in March 1933 and the production of automobiles stopped. When production ended in 1935 35,000 cars had been manufactured. Stutz Motor was charged by stock manipulation again in 1935, but without the excesses that occurred in 1920.

Stutz Motor filed for bankruptcy in April 1937, though its assets exceeded its liabilities. Creditors were unable to agree on a plan for revival and in April 1939, the bankruptcy court ordered its liquidation.

The former Indianapolis factory is today known as the Stutz Business Center and is home to more than eighty artists, sculptors, photographers, designers, architects, and craftsmen.

Models 
 1911–1925 Bearcat
 1926–1935 8-Cylinder
 Stutz Vertical Eight AA
 Stutz Vertical Eight BB
 Stutz Vertical Eight M
 Stutz Vertical Eight MA
 Stutz Vertical Eight MB
 Stutz Vertical Eight SV-16
 Stutz Vertical Eight DV-32

Revival Stutz Motor Car of America
Virgil Exner had more luck with the Stutz name. In August 1968, New York banker James O'Donnell raised funds and incorporated Stutz Motor Car of America. A prototype of Exner's Stutz Blackhawk was produced by Ghia, and the car debuted in 1970. All these cars used General Motors running gear, featuring perimeter-type chassis frames, automatic transmission, power steering and power brakes with discs at the front. Features included electric windows, air conditioning, central locking, electric seats, and leather upholstery. The sedans typically included a console for beverages in the rear seat.

This incarnation of Stutz had some reasonable success selling newly designed Blackhawks, Bearcats, Royale Limousines, IV Portes, and Victorias. Elvis Presley bought the first Blackhawk in 1971, and later purchased three more. Frank Sinatra, Dean Martin, Evel Knievel, Barry White, and Sammy Davis Jr. all owned Stutz cars. The Stutz Blackhawk owned by Lucille Ball was for a time on display at the Imperial Palace Hotel and Casino Auto Collection in Las Vegas. The Stutz was marketed as the "World's Most Expensive Car" with a Royale limousine priced at $285,000 and a Blackhawk coupé over US$115,000 in 1984

Production was limited and an estimated 617 cars were built during the company's first 25 years of existence (1971–1995). Sales of Stutz began to wane in 1985, but continued until 1995. Warren Liu became its main shareholder and took over ownership of Stutz Motor Cars in 1982.

Stutz models II

 Stutz Motor Car of America (Neoclassic automobiles)
 1970–1987 Blackhawk (coupe)
 1970–1979 - based on the Pontiac Grand Prix
 1980–1987 - based on the Pontiac Bonneville
 1979–1995 Bearcat (convertible)
 1977 - a converted Blackhawk
 1979 - based on the Pontiac Grand Prix
 1980–1986 - based on the Pontiac Bonneville, Buick LeSabre, or Oldsmobile Delta 88 Royale
 1987–1995 - based on the Pontiac Firebird or Chevrolet Camaro
 1970–1987 Duplex/IV-Porte/Victoria (sedan)
 197? Duplex
 1977–1987 IV-Porte - based on the Pontiac Bonneville, Buick LeSabre, or Oldsmobile 88
 1981– 1987 Victoria
 Diplomatica/Royale (limousine)
 Diplomatica - based on the Cadillac DeVille
 Royale - super-long limousine
 1984– Defender/Gazelle/Bear - Chevrolet Suburban-based armored SUV
 Gazelle - military SUV with mounted machine gun
 Bear - four-door convertible

References

A.K. Miller collection

 
Defunct motor vehicle manufacturers of the United States
Luxury motor vehicle manufacturers
Sports car manufacturers
Motor vehicle manufacturers based in Indiana
Manufacturing companies based in Indianapolis
Defunct companies based in Indianapolis
1914 establishments in Indiana
1935 disestablishments in Indiana
1971 establishments in Indiana
1992 disestablishments in Indiana
Vehicle manufacturing companies established in 1911
Vehicle manufacturing companies disestablished in 1935
Vehicle manufacturing companies established in 1971
Vehicle manufacturing companies disestablished in 1992
1910s cars
1920s cars
1930s cars
1980s cars
1990s cars
Brass Era vehicles
Vintage vehicles